Wangchuanchang Subdistrict is a subdistrict in southern Hebei District, Tianjin, China. It borders Ningyuan Subdistrict in its northwest, Jiangdu Road Subdistrict in its northeast, Chunhua Subdistrict in its south, and Guangfu Avenue Subdistrict in its southwest. It was home to 114,109 inhabitants as of 2010.

The subdistrict was created 1954.

Administrative divisions 
At the end of 2021, Wangchuanchang Subdistrict consisted of 14 residential communities. they are listed as follows:

References 

Township-level divisions of Tianjin
Hebei District, Tianjin